The 2019 1. deild kvinnur (also known as Betri deildin kvinnur for sponsorship reasons) was the 35th season of women's league football in the Faroe Islands. EB/Streymur/Skála were the defending champions, having won their 2nd title the previous season. The season started on 9 March and ended on 28 September.

Teams

The league was contested by five teams, a decrease from last season's six, as B68 joined ÍF/Víkingur to compete as ÍF/Víkingur/B68.

League table

Results
Each team played four times (twice at home and twice away) against every other team for a total of 16 matches each.

First and second round

Third and fourth round

Top goalscorers

References

External links
2019 1. deild kvinnur on Soccerway

1. deild kvinnur seasons
Faroe Islands
women
women